Kirovski is a Macedonian surname shared by the following people:
Hristijan Kirovski (b. 1985), Macedonian association football player
Jovan Kirovski (b. 1976), American association football player of Macedonian descent

See also
Kirov (disambiguation)